Pulseprogramming is an American electronic musical group and multimedia art project founded by Marc Hellner and Joel Kriske in Portland, Oregon in 1998. The band is currently centered on Marc Hellner and new member Chanel Pease. It has also included art directors John Schacter and Hans Seeger as art directors, video artist Eric David Johnson (DJ Bunny Ears), and poet Joel Craig. The collective began releasing intelligent dance music on Chicago label Aesthetics in 1999 and followed with releases on the same label in 2001 and 2003. The 2003 release Tulsa for One Second was described by Pitchfork Media as "Lap-pop".

In the years after Hellner and Kriske parted ways, Hellner released a record entitled Marriages enlisting production team Telefon Tel Aviv. The album was released by Peacefrog Records in 2005.

Releases
Pulseprogramming (CD/LP) Aesthetics 1999
1 Of 2 In 1000 (LP) Aesthetics 2001
2 Of 2 In 1000 (LP) Aesthetics 2001
Split (12") Outward Music Company (OMCO) 2002
Tulsa For One Second (CD/LP) Aesthetics 2003
Tulsa For One Second Remix Project (CD/LP) Aesthetics 2005
Marc Hellner 'Marriages' (CD/LP) Peacefrog 2005
'PLAY' Original Score L'Avventura Films 2005
From Nowhere Near (Original Scores for Film/TV) Form Music 2007
Charade is Gold (LP, Digi) Audraglint 2011

Remixes
The Awkwardness EP (CD, Maxi) I Change.C? (Pulseprog... Aesthetics 2001
Harvest Remixes (CD, Album, Dig) Gymnopedie #1 (Pulse P... Victor Entertainment Japan 2004

Tracks Appear On
OMCO Compilation (CD/LP) Mozzer, Test Tubes/Tin... Outward Music Company (OMCO) 1997
Installation:04 (CD) Detroitmembrings Masstransfer 2000
Compiled (CD) Oh' Halo (1894 Penny ... Aesthetics 2001
The Wire Tapper 7 (CD) To The Expert Eye Alone Wire Magazine 2001
The Wire Tapper 9 (2xCD) Blooms Eventually Wire Magazine 2002
Mind The Gap Volume 44 (CD) Blooms Eventually Gonzo Circus 2003
Nova Tunes 08 (CD) Blooms Eventually Nova Records 2003
Politronics (CD) Suck Or Run (Schneider... Onitor 2003
Sónar 2003 (2xCD) Off To Do Showery Snap... Mute Records Ltd. 2003
Wir_kommen_in_frieden (CD, Smplr, Comp, Promo) Off To Do Showery Snap... Persona Non Grata, Aesthetics 2003
Reconfigures (CD) Suck Or Run (Schneider... Earsugar 2004)

References

American multimedia artists
Musical groups from Portland, Oregon
Musical groups established in 1998
1998 establishments in Oregon
Peacefrog Records artists